São José Futsal, is a Brazilian futsal club from São José dos Campos founded in 2006 which plays in Liga Futsal.

Club honours

National competitions
 Jogos Abertos Brasileiros (3): 2007, 2011, 2012

State competitions
 Liga Paulista de Futsal (2): 2007, 2008

Current squad

References

External links
 São José official website
 São José LNF profile
 São José in zerozero.pt

Futsal clubs established in 2006
2006 establishments in Brazil
Futsal clubs in Brazil
Sports teams in São Paulo (state)